The San Diego Central Library is the main branch of the San Diego Public Library, which is a public library system serving the city of San Diego, California.

Description and history 

In 1952, the Carnegie library was demolished and a new Central Library was opened at the same location on June 27, 1954. That library closed permanently on June 9, 2013, to begin the 10-week process of transferring its 2.6-million-item collection to the new library. Over the years, many branch libraries have also been opened throughout the City.

In 2010, construction began on a new $184.9 million,  Central Library at 330 Park Boulevard in downtown San Diego. This 9-story structure was designed by San Diego architect Rob Wellington Quigley. It is topped with an iconic steel-and-mesh lattice dome over a two-story rare-book reading room. It opened on September 30, 2013. The library displays numerous books and collections, including the Sullivan Family Baseball Research Center. The Center houses the second largest collection of baseball memorabilia in the U.S. It was founded in 2000, with a donation of books from the Society for American Baseball Research. By 2012 its collection included thousands of books,, films, magazines, baseball cards and other memorabilia. It was intended to be the "go-to place for baseball research west of the Mississippi".

The Central Library also houses a charter high school, e3 Civic High School, which is billed as the only school in the U.S. to be housed within a library. The school is located on the sixth and seventh floors of the library and is visible to, but not accessible by, the public. The school serves grades 9 through 12. It opened on September 3, 2013 with an initial student body of 260 ninth and tenth graders. Additional grades were added in 2014 and 2015 resulting in a student body of approximately 500.

Awards 

In 2013, the Central Library received several awards. It received the National Award for Excellence in Structural Engineering, and the Decorative Concrete Council, a specialty council of the American Society of Concrete Contractors awarded the library "Best of Show". The Central Library also received an Orchid Award from the San Diego Architectural Foundation's Orchids & Onions Awards.

References

External links 

 

1954 establishments in California
2013 establishments in California
Libraries in San Diego
Library buildings completed in 1954
Library buildings completed in 2013
Public libraries in California